Stella Zhou (born 3 May 1973), born Xi Tao Zhou, is a Chinese-born table tennis player who represented Australia at the 1996 Summer Olympics and 2000 Summer Olympics. She is the elder sister of teammate Shirley Zhou.

References

1973 births
Living people
Table tennis players from Guangzhou
Australian female table tennis players
Chinese female table tennis players
Table tennis players at the 1996 Summer Olympics
Table tennis players at the 2000 Summer Olympics
Olympic table tennis players of Australia
Chinese emigrants to Australia
Naturalised table tennis players